Gradient enhanced NMR is a method for obtaining high resolution nuclear magnetic resonance spectra without the need for phase cycling. Gradient methodology is used extensively for two purposes, either rephasing (selection) or dephasing (elimination) of a particular magnetization transfer pathway. It includes the application of magnetic field gradient pulses to select specific coherences. By using actively shielded gradients, a gradient pulse is applied during the evolution period of the selected coherence to dephase the transverse magnetization and another gradient pulse refocuses the desired coherences remaining during the acquisition period.

Advantages
Significant reduction in measuring time
Reduced T1 artifacts 
Elimination of phase cycling and difference methods 
Possibility for three and four-quantum editing 
The ability to detect resonances at the same chemical shift as a strong solvent resonance

Drawbacks
A need for field-frequency-lock blanking during long runs.

Examples
Selection of transverse magnetization (Ix, Sx, Iy etc.):
 (+)gradient      180°(x)      (+)gradient 
Suppression of transverse magnetization (Ix, Sx, Iy etc.):
 (+)gradient      180°(x)      (-)gradient

References
*Ralph E. Hurd, Gradient-Enhanced Spectroscopy, Journal of magnetic resonance. 87, 422-428 (1990)

Nuclear magnetic resonance